
 
The Euthydikos Kore is a late archaic, Parian marble statue of the kore type, c 490–480 BCE, that once stood amongst the Akropolis votive sculptures. It was destroyed during the Persian invasion of 480 BCE and found in the Perserschutt.  It is named after the dedication on the base of the sculpture, “Euthydikos son of Thaliarchos dedicated [me]”. It now stands in the Acropolis Museum.

The surviving statue consists of two parts; the upper torso and head and the lower legs, feet and base, with the middle missing. The complete statue would have stood at 1.28m. The upper part was found in 1882 east of the Parthenon and the lower part in 1886-7 near the Erechtheion  that the two pieces were related was a connection made by Winter. The figure stands with left leg advanced (“almost like a kouros”). Her right forearm, now missing, would have been raised. She wears a chiton and a short Ionic himation draped from the right shoulder. The himation was once decorated with painted bands which Winter discerns as depicting two four-horse chariots, wrapping around the figure's left shoulder and disappearing behind her hair. A Nike may have appeared above the rightmost chariot, marking it out as victorious, but it is no longer visible. She also wears a taenia wound twice around the head. The eyes are heavy-lidded with both Lacrimal caruncle and canthus indicated. The lips are full, but with corners turning down and no archaic smile. In the ears both tragus and antitragus are present. The throat and collarbone are both lightly indicated. The metatarsals are depicted on the sculpture’s bare feet.

The base is a round Doric column capital, with the inscription, highlighted with red paint, running around the abacus. The layout of the text meant that the viewer could read the most crucial part of the text from a frontal position ("Euthydikos... dedicated [me]"), but required them to move around the sculpture in order to read the whole text. This movement of the viewer mirrors that of the chariots on the figure's himation.

Stylistically the statue marks the transition from the late archaic to the Severe Style. Described by Jeffrey Hurwit as 'an early classical statue in archaic dress', the Euthydikos kore exhibits a sense of volume and structure under the drapery that was novel. Since she is perhaps the last in the series of Acropolis korai and represents the beginning of the new style, the dating of the statue is of some significance. As stated, the bust was taken from a trench dug to the east of the Parthenon by Panagiotis Efstratiadis in 1882, though the stratigraphy of this trench had been compromised the layer in which the kore was found in was taken to be the Perserschutt. However, as Andrew Stewart argues this layer may be Kimonian or Periklean backfill against the south wall. Further, Stewart maintains that the burning observed on the Euthydikos kore is in fact colouration, that the kore can be grouped with the archaising Pig Relief and that the kore is by the same sculptor as the Blonde Boy. He also notes that the kore is not facially mutilated, suggesting that it was not vandalised by the Persians. This implies that the kore’s date may be placed later in the 470s and that the Severe Style developed after the Median War and perhaps as a consequence of it.

Notes

Explanatory notes

References

Bibliography

Sculptures in Athens
Korai